The 1696 Thomas Massey House is one of the oldest English Quaker homes in the Commonwealth of Pennsylvania. It is a 2-story brick and stone house, originally constructed by the English, Quaker settler, Thomas Massey in 1696. It is located on Lawrence Road near Sproul Road in Broomall, Pennsylvania.

Thomas Massey 
Thomas Massey was born in the village of Marpoole (Marple) in Cheshire, England.  He was a Quaker and an indentured servant to Francis Stanfield, who arranged for him and seven other indentured servants to emigrate to America. Thomas set sail from Chester, England aboard the ketch "Endeavor". He landed in Philadelphia, PA on September 29, 1683, at the age of twenty. After Thomas worked off his indenture, he received  of land from his master and another 50 acres from William Penn. In 1692, at age 29, Thomas married 22-year-old, Phebe Taylor, whom he had met aboard the Endeavor. Together they had seven children: Esther (1693), Mordecai (1695), James (1697), Hannah (1699), Thomas (1701), Phoebe (1705) and Mary (1707). Thomas Massey died in 1707/08 and Phebe remarried two years later. Their oldest son, Mordecai inherited the house and it remained in the Massey family until 1925.

Building history 
Thomas Massey built the original brick section in 1696 as an addition to an earlier wooden house. Thomas's son Mordecai Massey likely tore down the wooden house and built the first stone addition during the 1730s. A stone walled kitchen was added in the early nineteenth century with a second story above the kitchen added about 1860.

The house remained in the Massey family until 1925, and was used as a farmhouse into the 1930s when a furnace and electrical wiring were added. When the land around the house was developed into suburban housing, the Massey House was used for storage and painting.

In 1964, the house was saved from demolition by Massey's descendant, Lawrence M.C. Smith. The restoration was completed by architect, John Milner. During the restoration, a walk-in-fireplace and beehive oven were uncovered. Many of the home's original features have been restored and are fully functional.

The house was placed on the National Register of Historic Places in 1970 and is listed on the Historic American Buildings Survey. A Pennsylvania historical marker was dedicated on the site on May 9, 1986.

Tours and events 
The house is open to the public for tours from April through October on Sundays from 1 to 4 PM. It is seasonally decorated and furnished with authentic 17th and 18th century items, including some of the home's original fixtures, such as: cabinetry, furniture, cookware and dinnerware, books and tools.

Special events such as: lectures, demonstrations, dinners, cooking classes, gardening presentations and social gatherings are held throughout the year. At dinner events, an authentic colonial meal is prepared in the kitchen and served in the home.

Images

See also
List of the oldest buildings in Pennsylvania

References

External links
 Thomas Massey House Official website

Houses completed in 1708
Houses on the National Register of Historic Places in Pennsylvania
Historic American Buildings Survey in Pennsylvania
Museums in Delaware County, Pennsylvania
Historic house museums in Pennsylvania
Houses in Delaware County, Pennsylvania
National Register of Historic Places in Delaware County, Pennsylvania
1708 establishments in Pennsylvania